Angelo Francesco Antonio Costanzo (born 9 May 1976 in Adelaide) is a retired Australian soccer player. He was voted into the Adelaide United Team of the Decade. He is currently married to his wife, Helen and is the father of his two children; Domenic and Liliana.

Club career
In 1994 at 18 years of age he won the SA player of the year award at Salisbury United, and was invited to join Adelaide City on an off-season tour of Vietnam. In 1995/96, his first season in the national league, he played alongside two of Australia's most credentialed defenders in Alex Tobin and Milan Ivanovic, and established a regular starting position as Adelaide City reached the preliminary final.

Career statistics 
(Correct as of 29 January 2009)

1 – includes A-League final series statistics
2 – includes FIFA Club World Cup statistics; AFC Champions League statistics are included in season commencing after group stages (i.e. 2008 ACL in 2008–09 A-League season etc.)

National team statistics

International goals

Honours
With Adelaide United:
 A-League Premiership: 2005–2006

References

External links
 
 Oz Football profile

1976 births
Living people
Soccer players from Adelaide
Adelaide City FC players
A-League Men players
FFSA Super League players
Salisbury United FC players
Newcastle Jets FC players
Adelaide United FC players
Marconi Stallions FC players
National Soccer League (Australia) players
Australian people of Chilean descent
Sportspeople of Chilean descent
Association football defenders
Australian soccer players
Australia international soccer players
2002 OFC Nations Cup players